Life Stories is an album by guitarist Pat Donohue that was released in 1991.

Track listing
All songs by Pat Donohue unless otherwise noted
"This Is the Beginning" – 4:36
"Goin' Home/Oh Suzanna" (Donohue, Stephen Foster) – 4:01
"Hot Head" – 4:30
"Pig Iron" – 2:34
"High School" – 3:58
"The Hard Way" – 3:56
"I Don't Know That Guy" (Greg Brown) – 3:53
"All My Life" – 3:35
"Never Enough" – 3:49
"The Sway" – 3:50
"My Attorney Bernie" (Dave Frishberg) – 3:05
"The Glory of Love" (Billy Hill) – 2:52
"La Vie en Rose" (Mack David, Marcel Louiguy, Edith Piaf) – 4:23

Personnel
Pat Donohue – guitar, vocals
Peter Ostroushko – mandolin
Marc Anderson – percussion
Gordy Johnson – bass

Production notes
Steve Tibbetts – engineer
Tom Mudge – engineer
Phil Mendelson – mastering
Mary Ellen LaMotte – photography
Linda Beauvais – design

References

2003 albums
Pat Donohue albums